Kuh Kan may refer to:
 Kuh Kan-e Olya
 Kuh Kan-e Sofla